Gaius Mucius Cordus, better known with his later cognomen Scaevola, was an ancient Roman youth, possibly mythical, famous for his bravery.

In 508 BC, during the war between Rome and Clusium, the Clusian king Lars Porsena laid siege to Rome. Gaius Mucius Cordus, with the approval of the Roman Senate, sneaked into the Etruscan camp with the intent of murdering Porsena. Since it was the soldiers' pay day, there were two similarly dressed people, one of whom was the king, on a raised platform speaking to the troops. This caused Mucius to misidentify his target, and he killed Porsena's scribe by mistake. After being captured, he famously declared to Porsena: "I am Gaius Mucius, a citizen of Rome. I came here as an enemy to kill my enemy, and I am as ready to die as I am to kill. We Romans act bravely and, when adversity strikes, we suffer bravely." He also declared that he was the first of three hundred Roman youths to volunteer for the task of assassinating Porsena at the risk of losing their own lives.

"Watch", he is said to have declared, "so that you know how cheap the body is to men who have their eye on great glory". Mucius thrust his right hand into a fire which was lit for sacrifice and held it there without giving any indication of pain, thereby earning for himself and his descendants the cognomen Scaevola, meaning "left-handed". Porsena was shocked at the youth's bravery, and dismissed him from the Etruscan camp, free to return to Rome, saying "Go back, since you do more harm to yourself than me". At the same time, the king also sent ambassadors to Rome to offer peace.

Mucius was granted farming land on the right-hand bank of the Tiber, which later became known as the Mucia Prata (Mucian Meadows).

In popular culture

Dante Alighieri refers to Mucius and the sacrifice of his hand within the Divine Comedy. In Paradiso Canto 4: 82–87, along with St. Lawrence, Mucius is depicted as a person possessing the rarest and firmest of wills. 
In a poem in Musa Posthuma, Martha Marchina compared Mucius unfavorably to the martyr Martha and suggests that Martha was the stronger hero because she suffered worse on behalf of God.  
Jean-Jacques Rousseau mentions in Book One of his Confessions that as a child, he attempted to replicate Mucius' action by placing his hand over a chafing dish.
 At the age of twelve, Friedrich Nietzsche, attempting to prove to his classmates at Schulpforta that the story could be true, burnt his outstretched palm over a book of burning matches without expression of pain and was only saved from serious harm by the school's prefect.
Gordon Scott portrayed Mucius in the sword-and-sandal film Hero of Rome (1964), which was loosely based on this story.
Since 1991 Spanish cultural association Fuerzas de Choque Extraordinarii from the Carthaginians and Romans festivities of Cartagena has Gaius Mucius Scaevola as their commander.

See also
 Cloelia
 Et facere et pati fortia Romanum est
 Mucia (gens)
 Týr

References

Characters in Roman mythology
Ancient Roman soldiers
Year of birth unknown
Year of death unknown
6th-century BC Romans
Scaevola, Gaius
Failed regicides
Ancient Roman assassins